Patna (
), historically known as Pataliputra, is the capital and largest city of the state of Bihar in India. According to the United Nations, as of 2018, Patna had a population of 2.35 million, making it the 19th largest city in India. Covering  and over 2.5 million people, its urban agglomeration is the 18th largest in India. Patna serves as the seat of Patna High Court. The Buddhist, Hindu and Jain pilgrimage centres of Vaishali, Rajgir, Nalanda, Bodh Gaya and Pawapuri are nearby and Patna City is a sacred city for Sikhs as the tenth Sikh Guru, Guru Gobind Singh was born here. The modern city of Patna is mainly on the southern bank of the river Ganges. The city also straddles the rivers Sone, Gandak and Punpun.

One of the oldest continuously inhabited places in the world, Patna was founded in 490 BCE by the king of Magadha. Ancient Patna, known as Pataliputra, was the capital of the Magadh Empire through Haryanka, Nanda, Mauryan, Shunga, Gupta and Pala dynasties. Pataliputra was a seat of learning and fine arts. It was home to many astronomers and scholars including Aryabhata, Vātsyāyana and Chanakya. During the Maurya period (around 300 BCE) its population was about 400,000. Patna served as the seat of power, and political and cultural centre of the Indian subcontinent during the Maurya and Gupta empires. With the fall of the Gupta Empire, Patna lost its glory. It was revived again in the 17th century by the British as a centre of international trade. Following the partition of Bengal presidency in 1912, Patna became the capital of Bihar and Orissa Province.

Until the 19th century it was a major trading and commercial hub in India. After independence there were a few downturns but its economy was still stable. After the separation of Jharkhand from Bihar, it lost its glory. Now trials are made to develop the city. As per the Directorate of Economics and Statistics (Government of Bihar), Nominal GDP of Patna District was estimated at INR 63,176.55 crores in 2011-12. As of 2011-12, Patna already recorded per capita gross domestic product of 1,08,657, way ahead of many other Indian cities and state capitals. Using figures for assumed average annual growth, Patna is the 21st fastest growing city in the world and 5th fastest growing city in India according to a study by the City Mayors Foundation. Patna registered an average annual growth of 3.72% during 2006–2010. As of 2011-12, GDP per capita of Patna is ₹1,08,657 and its GDP growth rate is 7.29 per cent. In June 2009, the World Bank ranked Patna second in India (after Delhi) for ease of starting a business.

Etymology

The name of this city has changed with time. One of the oldest cities of India, there are several theories regarding the origin of the modern name Patna (Bengali: পাটনা; Devanagari: पटना; Kaithi: 𑂣𑂗𑂢𑂰; Gurmukhi: ਪਟਨਾ; Urdu: پٹنہ). It is etymologically derived from Patan (Devanagari: पटन), the name of the Hindu goddess, Patan Devi. Patan Devi Mandir is still in old Patna near Gulzarbagh mandi along with another, Patan Devi Mandir, near Takht Sri Patna Sahib. Many believe Patna derived its name from Patli, a tree variety that was found in abundance in the historic city. It is also seen on the state tourism's logo. The place is mentioned in Chinese traveller Fa Hien's records as Pa-lin-fou. The city has been known by various names through more than 2,000 years of existence – Pataligrama, Pataliputra, Kusumapura, Kusumdhwaja Pushpapuram, Padmavathi, Azimabad and the present-day Patna. Legend ascribes the origin of Patna to the mythological King Putraka who created Patna by magic for his queen Patali, literally "trumpet flower", which gives it its ancient name Pataligrama. It is said that in honour of the queen's first-born, the city was named Pataliputra. Gram is Sanskrit for village and  Putra means son. Legend also says that the Emerald Buddha was created in Patna (then Pataliputra) by Nagasena in 43 BCE.

History

Ancient Era
Traditional Buddhist literature attributes foundation of Patna 490 BCE as Ajatashatru, the king of Magadha, wanted to shift his capital from the hilly Rajagrha (today Rajgir) to a strategically chosen place to better combat the Licchavis of Vaishali. He chose the site on the bank of the Ganges and fortified the area. Gautama Buddha travelled through this place in the last year of his life. He prophesied a great future for this place even as he predicted its ruin due to flood, fire and feud. According to Dieter Schlingloff, the Buddhist accounts may have presented the grandeur of Patna as a prophecy and that its wooden fortifications unlike other early historic Indian cities indicate that it might be much older than thought but only archaeological excavation and C14 dates of its wooden palisades which is presently lacking may establish this.

Mauryan Empire

Megasthenes, the Indo-Greek historian and ambassador to the court of Chandragupta Maurya, gave one of the earliest accounts of the city. Megasthenes, the Greek ambassador to India, described the city as the greatest city on earth during its heyday. The Shungas ultimately retained control of Pataliputra and ruled for almost 100 years. The Shungas were followed by the Kanvas and eventually by the Guptas. A number of Chinese travellers came to India in pursuit of knowledge and recorded their observations about Pataliputra in their travelogues. One such famous account was recorded by a Chinese Buddhist traveller Fa Hien, who visited India between 399 and 414 CE, and stayed here for many months translating Buddhist texts. When Chinese Buddhist Monk Faxian visited the city in 400 A.D, he found the people to be rich and prosperous; they practised virtue and justice. He found that the nobles and householders of the city had constructed several hospitals in which the poor of all countries, the destitute, the crippled and the diseased can get treatment. They could receive every kind of help gratuitously. Physicians would inspect the diseases, and order them food, drink, and medicines.

Gupta and Pala empire

In the years that followed, many dynasties ruled the Indian subcontinent from the city, including the Gupta dynasty and the Pala kings. With the disintegration of the Gupta empire, Patna passed through uncertain times. Bakhtiar Khilji captured Bihar in the 12th century and destroyed everything, and Patna lost its prestige as the political and cultural centre of India.

Mughal Empire

The Mughal Empire was a period of unremarkable provincial administration from Delhi. The most remarkable period during the Middle Ages was under the Afghan emperor Sher Shah Suri, who revived Patna in the middle of the 16th century. He built a fort and founded a town on the banks of the Ganges. Sher Shah's fort in Patna does not survive, although the Sher Shah Suri mosque, built in Afghan architectural style, does. Mughal emperor Akbar reached Patna in 1574 to crush the rebellious Afghan Chief Daud Khan. One of the navratnas from Akbar's court, his official historian and author of "Ain-i-Akbari" Abul Fazl refers to Patna as a flourishing centre for paper, stone and glass industries. He also refers to the high quality of numerous strains of rice grown in Patna, famous as Patna rice in Europe. By 1620, the city of Patna was being described as the "chiefest mart towne of all Bengala" (i.e. largest town in Bengal) in northern India, "the largest town in Bengal and the most famous for trade". This was before the founding of the city of Calcutta. Mughal Emperor Aurangzeb acceded to the request of his favourite grandson, Prince Muhammad Azim, to rename Patna as Azimabad, in 1704 while Azim was in Patna as the subedar. Patna or Azimabad did see some violent activities, according to Phillip Mason, writing in the book "The Men Who Ruled India". "Aurangzeb had restored the poll-tax (Jazia) on unbelievers and this had to be compounded for. In Patna, Peacock the Chief of the factory was not sufficiently obliging and was seized, forced to walk through the town bare-headed and bare-footed and subjected to many other indignities before he paid up and was released." Little changed during this period other than the name. With the decline of the Mughal empire, Patna moved into the hands of the Nawabs of Bengal, who levied a heavy tax on the populace but allowed it to flourish as a commercial centre. The mansions of the Maharaja of Tekari Raj dominated the Patna riverfront in 1811–12. In 1750, the future Nawab of Bengal, Siraj ud-Daulah revolted against his grandfather, Alivardi Khan, and seized Patna, but quickly surrendered and was forgiven. Guru Gobind Singh (22 December 1666 – 7 October 1708), the tenth Guru of the Sikhs, was born as Gobind Rai in Patna to Guru Teg Bahadur, the ninth Guru of the Sikhs, and his wife Mata Gujri. His birthplace, Patna Sahib, is one of the most sacred sites of pilgrimage for Sikhs.

Portuguese Empire 
As trade grew, settlements of the Portuguese empire expanded to the Bengal Gulf. Since at least 1515 the Portuguese were at Bengal as traders, and later in 1521 an embassy was sent to Gaur to be able to create factories in the region. The Bengal Sultan after 1534 allowed the Portuguese to create several settlements as Chitagoong e Satgaon. In 1535 the Portuguese were allied with the Bengal sultan and held the Teliagarhi pass 280 km from Patna helping to avoid the invasion by the Mughals. By then several of the products came from Patna and the Portuguese send in traders, establishing a factory there since 1580 at least. The products were shipped out down the river until other Portuguese ports as Chittagoon e Satgaoon, and from there to the rest of the empire.

British Empire
During the 17th century, Patna became a centre of international trade. In 1620, the English East India Company established a factory in Patna for trading in calico and silk. Soon it became a trading centre for saltpetre. Francois Bernier, in Travels in the Mogul Empire (1656–1668), says ". It was carried down the Ganges with great facility, and the Dutch and English sent large cargoes to many parts of the Indies, and to Europe". This trade encouraged other Europeans, principally the French, Danes, Dutch and Portuguese, to compete in the lucrative business. Peter Mundy, writing in 1632, described Patna as "the greatest mart of the eastern region". After the decisive Battle of Buxar of 1764, as per the treaty of Allahabad East India Company was given the right to collect tax of this former Mughal province by the Mughal emperor. Patna was annexed by the company in 1793 to its territory when Nizamat (Mughal suzerainty) was abolished and the British East India Company took control of the province of Bengal-Bihar. Patna however continued as a trading centre. In 1912, when the Bengal Presidency was partitioned, Patna became the capital of the British province of Bihar and Orissa, although in 1936 Orissa became a separate entity with its own capital. Till date, a major population of Bengalis live in Patna particularly.

Indian Independence Movement

People from Patna were greatly involved in the Indian independence movement. Most notable movements were the Champaran movement against the Indigo plantation and the 1942 Quit India Movement. National leaders who came from the city include Swami Sahajanand Saraswati; the first President of the Constituent Assembly of India, Dr. Rajendra Prasad; Bihar Vibhuti (Anugrah Narayan Sinha); Basawon Singh (Sinha); and Loknayak (Jayaprakash Narayan).

Post-Independence
Patna remained the capital of Bihar after India gained independence in 1947, even as Bihar was partitioned again in 2000 when Jharkhand became a separate state of the Indian union. On 27 October 2013, six people were killed and 85 others were injured in a series of co-ordinated bombings at an election rally for BJP candidate Narendra Modi. On 3 October 2014, 33 people were killed and 26 injured in a stampede at Gandhi Maidan during Vijaya Dashmi celebrations.

Geography

Topography

Patna is on the southern bank of the river Ganges. Of this, the municipal area constitutes . A characteristic feature of the geography of Patna is its confluence of major rivers.

During the British Raj, Patna was part of the Bengal Presidency. After Nalanda district was carved out of Patna district in 1976, Patna was purged of all hilly regions. It is an alluvial, flat expanse of land. The land in the district is too fertile and is almost entirely cultivated with no forest cover. Alluvial soil found here is ideal for cultivation of rice, sugarcane and other foodgrains. The area under cultivation is studded with mango orchards and bamboo groves. In the fields along the banks of river Ganges, weeds such as ammannia, citriculari, hygrophile and sesbania grow. But palmyra, date palm and mango orchards are found near habitations. Dry stretches of shrubbery are sometimes seen in the villages far from the rivers. Trees commonly found are bel, siris, jack fruit and the red cotton tree. Patna is unique in having four large rivers in its vicinity. It is the largest riverine city in the world. The topography of Patna city is saucer shaped as per Patna City Development Plan prepared in 2006. The bridge over the river Ganges named Mahatma Gandhi Setu is 5575m long and is the longest river bridge in the India.

Patna comes under India's seismic zone-IV, indicating its vulnerability to major earthquakes, but earthquakes have not been common in recent history. Patna also falls in the risk zone for floods and cyclones.

Climate

Patna has a humid subtropical climate under the Köppen climate classification: (Cwa) with extremely hot summers from late March to June, the monsoon season from late June to late September and chilly winter nights and foggy or sunny days from November to February.

The table below details historical monthly averages for climate variables.

Air pollution
Pollution is a major concern in Patna. According to the CAG report, tabled in the Bihar Legislative Assembly in April 2015, respirable suspended particulate matter (RSPM) level (PM-10) in Patna was 355, three-and-a-half times higher than the prescribed limit of 100 micro-gram per cubic metre, primarily due to high vehicular and industrial emissions and construction activities in the city. In May 2014, a World Health Organization survey declared Patna the second most air polluted city in India, only after Delhi, with the survey calculating the airborne particulate matter in the state capital's ambient air (PM-2.5) to be 149 micro-grams, six times more than the safe limit, which is 25 micro-grams. Severe air pollution in the city has caused a rise in pollution-related respiratory ailments, such as lung cancer, asthma, dysentery and diarrhoea. The dense smog in Patna during winter season results in major air and rail traffic disruptions every year.

Economy

Patna has long been a major agricultural hub and centre of trade. Its most active exports are grain, sugarcane, sesame, and medium-grained Patna rice. There are several sugar mills in and around Patna. It is an important business and luxury brand centre of eastern India. The economy of Patna has seen sustained economic growth since 2005. The economy has been spurred by growth in the fast-moving consumer goods industry, the service sector, along with Green revolution businesses. In 2009, the World Bank stated Patna as the second best city in India to start up a business. As of 2011-12, GDP per capita of Patna is 1,08,657 and its GDP growth rate is 7.29 per cent. Patna is the 21st fastest growing city in the world and the fifth fastest-growing city in India, and is expected to grow at an average annual rate of 3.72%. The major business districts of the city are Bander Bagicha, Exhibition Road, Gandhi Maidan Marg, Frazer Road, Indrapuri and Maurya Lok.

Earlier Patna was an international trading hub and a major textile center. Going back to the 19th century when silk factory was set up here, so many foreign traders came to visit it and have some income. After the independence the economy was still stable. After the independence many vegetables and vegetable oils were manufactured in the city. Until 1980s up and down in economy was there. But till the 1990s, when liberalisation came in India, Patna didn't receive any global funds and foreign investments. The trading and economic environment were fully destroyed. There were many fertiliser plants and sugar mills. But to week ecosystem, company saw loses and it was also get closed.

A large number of manufacturing companies Hero Cycles, Britannia Industries, PepsiCo, Sonalika Tractors and UltraTech Cement have come with there manufacturing plants in Patna metropolitan area. World's second largest leather cluster is in Fatuha at Patna. Patna is also emerging as an IT based economy. Tata Consultancy Services-Patna got operational in 2019 at its new office. Many business park are introduced to the city.

Demographics

With an estimated population of 1.68 million in 2011, Patna is the 19th most populous city in India and with over 2 million people, its urban agglomeration is the 18th largest in India. Residents of Patna are referred to by the demonym Patnaite.

According to 2011 census data, Patna city had a population of 1,683,200 (before the expansion of the city limits) within the corporation limits, with 894,158 men and 789,042 women. This was an increase of 22.2 percent compared to the 2001 figures. 11.32 percent of the population was under six years of age, with 102,208 boys and 88,288 girls. The overall literacy rate is 83.37%, with the male literacy rate being 87.35% and the female literacy rate being 79.89%. The sex ratio of Patna is 885 females per 1,000 males. The child sex ratio of girls is 877 per 1000 boys. The urban agglomeration had a population of 2,046,652 of which 1,087,864 are males and 958,788 are females with 82.73% literacy. Patna is the second largest city in eastern India.

According to the 2011 census of India, Patna's major religion is Hinduism with 86.39% followers. Islam is the second most popular religion in Patna with approximately 12.27% following it. Christianity, Jainism, Sikhism, and Buddhism, with smaller followings, are also practiced in Patna. During the last census report, around 0.01% stated other religions and approximately 0.49% stated no particular religion.

Roughly 0.25% of Patna's population lives in slums which makes Patna, the city with the lowest percentage of people living in slums in India. Like other fast-growing cities in the developing world, Patna suffers from major urbanisation problems including unemployment, poor public health, and poor civic and educational standards for a large section of the population. In 2015, the National Sample Survey Organisation revealed that, for females, Patna had the highest unemployment rate 34.6%, and for males, it was the second highest with a rate of 8% in 2011–12.

Hindi is the official language of the state of Bihar and Urdu is the additional official language, but many other languages are spoken too. The native Language is Magadhi or Magahi, named after Magadha, the ancient name of South Bihar and is most widely spoken. Other spoken dialects and languages include Bhojpuri, Angika,  Maithili, Bengali, and Oriya.

Administration
The Patna sub-division (Tehsil) is one of the 6 Tehsils of the Patna district. It is headed by an IAS or state Civil service officer of the rank of Sub Divisional Magistrate (SDM). The SDM of Patna Tehsil reports to the District Magistrate (DM) of Patna District.

Blocks
The Patna Tehsil is divided into 3 Blocks, each headed by a Block Development Officer (BDO). The list of Blocks is as follows:
 Patna
 Sampatchak
 Phulwari Sharif

Government

Civic administration
The civic administration of Patna is run by several government agencies and has overlapping structural divisions. At least five administrative definitions of the city are available; listed in ascending order of area, those are: Patna division, Patna district (also the Patna Police area), the Patna Metropolitan Region (also known as Patna Planning area), "Greater Patna" or PRDA area, which adds to the PMC area a few areas just adjacent to it and Patna Municipal Corporation area.
The Patna Municipal Corporation, or PMC, oversees and manages the civic infrastructure of the city's 75 wards, which accommodates a population of 1.7 million as per 2011 Census. The municipal corporation consists of democratically elected members, each ward elects a Councillor to the PMC. The PMC is in charge of the civic and infrastructure needs of the metropolis.
As Patna's apex body, the corporation discharges its functions through the mayor-in-council, which comprises a mayor, a deputy mayor, and other elected members of the PMC. The Mayor is usually chosen through indirect election by the councillors from among themselves. The functions of the PMC include water supply, drainage and sewerage, sanitation, solid waste management, street lighting, and building regulation.
The Municipal Commissioner is the chief Executive Officer and head of the executive arm of the Municipal Corporation. All executive powers are vested in the Municipal Commissioner who is an Indian Administrative Service (IAS) officer appointed by the state government. Although the Municipal Corporation is the legislative body that lays down policies for the governance of the city, it is the Commissioner who is responsible for the execution of the policies. The Commissioner is appointed for a fixed term as defined by state statute. The powers of the Commissioner are those provided by statute and those delegated by the Corporation or the Standing Committee. As of June 2017, the BJP won PMC Mayor seat; the mayor is Sita Sahu, while the deputy mayor is Vinay Kumar Pappu. The Patna Municipal Corporation was ranked 4th out of 21 Cities for best governance & administrative practices in India in 2014. It scored 3.6 on 10 compared to the national average of 3.3. The revenue district of Patna comes under the jurisdiction of a District Collector (District Magistrate). The Collectors are in charge of the general administration, property records and revenue collection for the Central Government, and oversee the national elections held in the city. The Bihar Urban Infrastructure Development Corporation Limited (BUIDCO) and the Patna Metropolitan Area Authority, are responsible for the statutory planning and development of the Patna Metropolitan Region. Patna Metropolitan Area Authority was established in 2016. It is the superseding agency for the former Patna Regional Development Authority (PRDA), which was dissolved in 2006. In addition to the city government, numerous commissions and state authorities—including the Ministry of Tourism, the Bihar Health Department, the Bihar Water Resources Department, National Ganga River Basin Authority, Bihar State Pollution Control Board and the Bihar Public Service Commission—play a role in the life of Patnaites. As the capital of Bihar, Patna plays a major role not only in state politics but in central politics as well. 

In October 2016, the Bihar cabinet approved the Patna master plan 2031 which envisages the development of a new airport at Bihta. Patna master 2031 is the second master plan of the city that has been passed ever, after the last plan was approved for 1961-1981. Patna master plan covers six urban local bodies - Patna Municipal Corporation, Danapur Nagar Parishad, Phulwarisharif Nagar Parishad, Khagaul Nagar Parishad, Maner Nagar Panchayat and Fatuha Nagar Parishad.

Patna has been selected as one of the hundred Indian cities to be developed as a smart city under Government of India's flagship Smart Cities Mission. With the grade of a Smart City, Patna will have highly up-to-date and radical provisions like uninterrupted electric supply, first-rate traffic and transport system, superior health care and many other prime utilities. Under this scheme, the city will use digital technology that will act as the integral mechanism of the aforesaid facilities and thereby further elevate the lifestyle of the citizens. A special purpose vehicle company named the Patna Smart City Limited has been formed to implement the smart city projects. On 22 November 2017, Eptisa Servicios de Ingenieria SL of Spain was chosen as the project management consultant.

Politics
As the seat of the Government of Bihar, The city has several federal facilities, including the Raj Bhavan: Governor's house, the Bihar Legislative Assembly; the state secretariat, which is housed in the Patna Secretariat; and the Patna High Court. The Patna High Court is one of the oldest High Court in India. The Patna High Court has jurisdiction over the state of Bihar. Patna also has lower courts; the Small Causes Court for civil matters, and the Sessions Court for criminal cases. The Patna Police, commanded by Senior Superintendent of Police, is overseen by the Bihar Government's Home Department. The Patna district elects two representatives to India's lower house, the Lok Sabha, and 14 representatives to the state legislative assembly.

Utility services 

Groundwater fulfills the basic needs of the people, administered by Patna Jal Parishad under Patna Municipal Corporation. The public water supply system comprises 98 tube wells that pump water directly to the distribution mains. Around 23 overhead reservoirs of which only the one's at Agam Kuan, Gulzarbagh Press, Guru Gobind Singh Hospital and High Court serves the city. The sewerage system in Patna was set up in 1936. At present, there are four sewage treatment plants at Saidpur, Beur, Pahari and Karmali Chak. In 2019, the central government has started the process Nirmal Ganga, which is to build new sewerage infrastructure at Patna's Karmalichak as well as in Barh, Naugachia and Sultanganj. The new infrastructure will be capable of preventing the flow of 67 million litre of sewage into Ganga.

As of 2011, the city's electricity consumption is about 601 kWh per capita, even though the actual demand is much higher. Electricity supply to the city is regulated and distributed by the South Bihar Power Distribution Company Limited managed by Bihar State Power Holding Company Limited (the holding company and a successor company of erstwhile Bihar State Electricity Board). The city forms the Patna Electricity Supply Unit (PESU) Circle, which is further divided into two wings namely Patna East (consists Kankarbagh, Patna City, Gulzarbagh, Bankipore, Rajendra Nagar Divisions)
and Patna West (Consists Danapur, New Capital, Pataliputra, Gardanibagh, Dak Bungalow divisions).

Direct–to–home (DTH) is available via DD Free Dish, Airtel digital TV, Dish TV, Tata Sky, Videocon d2h, Sun Direct and Reliance Digital TV. Cable companies include Darsh Digital Network Pvt. Ltd., SITI Maurya Cablenet Pvt. Ltd etc. The Conditional Access System for cable television was implemented in March 2013.

Patna comes under the Patna Telecom District of the Bharat Sanchar Nigam Limited (BSNL), India's state-owned telecom and internet services provider. Both Global System for Mobile Communications (GSM) and Code division multiple access (CDMA) mobile services are available. Apart from telecom, BSNL also provides broadband internet service. Among private enterprises, Bharti Airtel, Reliance Jio, Reliance GSM/CDMA, Idea Cellular, Aircel, Tata Teleservices (Tata DoCoMo, Virgin Mobile and Tata Indicom), Telenor (Formerly Uninor & Now Acquired by Bharti Airtel), Vodafone and Videocon Telecom are the leading telephone and cell phone service providers in the city.

Patna was the second Indian city, after Bangalore, which offered free WiFi connectivity to its citizens in February 2014. By surpassing the previous record-holder, Beijing in China, Patna's WiFi zone is the world's longest free WiFi zone, which covers a 20-km stretch from NIT Patna on Ashok Rajpath to Danapur.

Transport

Roads

Patna is about 100 km south of national East – West Highway corridor. The NH 30, NH 31 and NH 2 passes through the city. The Ashok Rajpath, Patna-Danapur Road, Bailey Road, Harding Road and Kankarbagh old bypass Road are the major corridors. Patna was one of the first places in India to use horse-drawn trams for public transport. Public transportation is provided for by buses, auto rickshaws and local trains. Auto rickshaws are said to be the lifeline of the city. BSRTC has started City bus service on all major routes of Patna. App based cab service is available within city.   Patna is about 70.02KM away from Chhapra

Air transport

Patna Airport known as Lok Nayak Jayaprakash Narayan International Airport is classified as a restricted international airport. The arrival of several low-cost carriers and a number of new destinations have caused a growth in air traffic in recent years, as has an improvement in the situation with regard to law and order. For the period April to December 2009 the airport ranked first in a survey of 46 airports in the country in terms of percentage growth of domestic passengers as well as domestic aircraft movement. The Airport Authority of India (AAI) has proposed to develop a civil enclave at Bihta Air Force Station to serve as the new airport for Patna.

Railways

Patna is served by several railway stations within. The Patna Junction railway station is the main railway station of the city, and one of the busiest railway stations in India. Patna lies in between New Delhi and Kolkata on Howrah–Delhi main line, which is one of the busiest rail routes in India. Patna Junction is directly connected to most of the major cities in India. Danapur is the divisional headquarters of East Central Railway zone's Danapur railway division. Patna is well connected with neighbouring Gaya, Jehanabad, Bihar Sharif, Rajgir, Islampur through daily passenger and express train services. And also connected with Jamalpur Junction and Munger. India's longest road-cum-rail bridge, Digha–Sonpur bridge has been constructed across river Ganges, connecting Digha, Patna to Pahleja Ghat in Sonpur.

The city is served by several major road highways and state highways, including National Highways 19, 30, 31, and 83. Pataliputra Bus Terminal is an upcoming ISBT. Asia's longest river bridge, the Mahatma Gandhi Setu (built 1982), is in Patna and connects the city to Hajipur across the Ganga. In recent times, the bridge has been witnessing major traffic chaos and accidents due to exceeding number of vehicles passing over it and regularly overloading the structure. A new six lane road bridge across the Ganges parallel to Mahatma Gandhi Setu is proposed which would connect Kacchi Dargah in Patna City to Bidupur in Vaishali district, which will be the longest bridge in India after completion.
Patna is well connected with roads to various major cities of Bihar like Hajipur, Munger, Jamalpur, Bhagalpur, Gaya, and Purnia.

Patna is  East from Delhi,  North East from Mumbai, North from Hyderabad and  North West from Kolkata. Luxury bus service between Patna and several neighbouring cities is provided by the Bihar State Tourism Development Corporation and the Bihar State Road Transport Corporation. Auto rickshaws are a popular mode of transportation. Prepaid auto services operated by an all-women crew was started in 2013 in Patna, which is the first of its kind in India. Radio Taxi services are also available within city limit as well as outskirts. There are private options such as Ola Cabs.

Metro
Patna Metro is an under-construction rapid transit system for the city. It would be owned and operated by state run Patna Metro Rail Corporation. It will be constructed on Public Private Partnership (PPP) mode, estimated to cost . It will have 5 lines with a total planned length of  km, which will be built in 3 phases. Patna Monorail Project covering the municipal area is also underway. Recently the central government approved Patna metro rail project comprising two corridors (Danapur - Khemnichak and Patna Junction - Pataliputra Bus Terminal). According to government, the project will be completed until 2025 with an estimated cost of Rs. 133657.7 million.
The Ganges – navigable throughout the year – was the principal river highway across the vast Indo-Gangetic Plain. Vessels capable of accommodating five hundred merchants were known to ply this river in the ancient period; it served as a major trade route, as goods were transported from Pataliputra to the Bay of Bengal and further, to ports in Sri Lanka and Southeast Asia. The role of the Ganges as a channel for trade was enhanced by its natural links – it embraces all the major rivers and streams in both north and south Bihar. In recent times, Inland Waterways Authority of India has declared the stretch of river Ganges between Allahabad and Haldia National Inland Waterway and has taken steps to restore and maintain its navigability. The National Waterway-1, the longest Waterway in India, stretches 1620 km in the River Ganga from Allahabad to Haldia via Varanasi, Munger, Bhagalpur passes through Patna. This National Waterways has fixed terminal at Patna.

Culture
 

Patna's native language is Magahi or Magadhi a language derived from the ancient Magadhi Prakrit, which was created in the ancient kingdom of Magadha, the core of which was the area of Patna south of the Ganges. It is believed to be the language spoken by Gautama Buddha. Patna has a vibrant Bengali culture too with many Bengali stalwarts including the first Chief Minister of post-independence West Bengal, Bidhan Chandra Ray, being born here. The numerous Bengali speaking Patnaites have contributed massively into fine arts, culture, education and history of Bihar in general and Patna in particular. However, Magahi was the official language of the Mauryan court, in which the edicts of Ashoka were composed.

The name Magahi is directly derived from the name Magadhi Prakrit, and educated speakers of Magahi prefer to call it "Magadhi" rather than "Magahi".

Patna has many buildings adorned with Indo-Islamic and Indo-Saracenic architectural motifs. Several well-maintained major buildings from the colonial period have been declared "heritage structures"; others are in various stages of decay. Established in 1917 as the Bihar's first museum, the Patna Museum (पटना संग्रहालय) houses large collections that showcase Indian natural history and Indian art. The Khuda Bakhsh Oriental Library and Sinha Library are historic public libraries of Patna.

Several theatres are in or near the central part of the city, including the Bhartiya Nritya Kala Mandir, the Rabindra Parishad, Premchand Rangshala and the Kalidas Rangalaya, which is home to the Bihar art theatre. Kalidas Rangalaya also hosts the Patliputra Natya Mahotsav, a dance festival. But in the last two decades, the popularity of commercial theatres in the city has declined.

The Patna School of Painting or Patna Qalaam, some times also called Company style, is an offshoot of the well-known Mughal Miniature school of painting, which flourished in Bihar during the early 18th to the mid-20th centuries. The practitioners of this art form were descendants of Hindu artisans of Mughal painting who facing persecution under the Mughal Emperor Aurangzeb and who found refuge, via Murshidabad, in Patna during the late 18th century. The Patna painters differed from the Mughal painters, whose subjects included only royalty and court scenes, in that they included as subjects bazaar scenes, scenes of Indian daily life, local dignitaries, festivals and ceremonies, and nature scenes. The paintings were executed in watercolours on paper and on mica, but the style was generally of a hybrid and undistinguished quality. It is this school of painting that inspired the formation of the College of Arts and Crafts, Patna, under the leadership of Shri Radha Mohan, which is an important centre of fine arts in Bihar.

Street foods such as samosa, chaat, jalebi, litti chokha, phuchka (a deep-fried crêpe with tamarind sauce), South Indian and Chinese cuisine are favourite among Patnaites. Taj Hotel Patna is under construction at Budh Marg Lodipur.

Bihari Women have traditionally worn cotton sari but shalwar kameez and other western attire are gaining acceptance among younger women. Western attire has gained wide acceptance among the urban men, although the traditional dhoti and kurta are seen during festivals. Chhath, also called Dala Chhath, is a major ancient festival in Bihar. It is celebrated twice a year: once in the summer, called the Chaiti Chhath, and once about a week after Deepawali, called the Kartik Chhath. Durga Puja, held in September–October, is Patna's another important festival; it is an occasion for glamorous celebrations. Among the city's other festivals, are Saraswati Puja, Eid, Holi, Christmas, Vishwakarma Puja, Makar Sankranti, Raksha Bandhan and Rath Yatra. Cultural events include the Patna Book Fair, Patna Sahib Mahotsav, the Patna Film Festival, Bihar Diwas, Rajgir Mahotsav, Vaishali Mahotsav and the Sonepur Cattle Fair in neighbouring towns.

Tourism

Patna is home to many tourist attractions and it saw about 2.4 million tourists (including day visitors) in 2005. Tourists visiting the city accounted for 41% of the total number of tourists visiting Bihar although Bodh Gaya was the most popular destination for foreign visitors. The cultural heritage of Bihar is reflected in its many ancient monuments. Kumhrar and Agam Kuan are the sites of the ruins of the Ashokan Pataliputra. Didarganj Yakshi remains as an example of Mauryan art.

Takht Sri Patna Sahib is one of the Five Takhts of Sikhism and consecrates the birthplace of the tenth Guru of the Sikhs, Gobind Singh. There are five other Gurdwaras in Patna that are related to different Sikh Gurus; these are Gurdwara Pahila Bara, Gurdwara Gobind Ghat, Gurdwara Guru ka Bagh,
Gurdwara Bal Leela, Gurdwara Handi Sahib, and Prakash Punj. Padri Ki Haveli, High Court, Golghar, Sultan Palace, and Secretariat Building are examples of British architecture. Gandhi Maidan is a historic ground in Patna where several freedom movement rallies took place. Nealy built Buddha Smriti Park near Patna Junction is also becoming a major tourist attraction.

The Patna Planetarium (Indira Gandhi Planetarium) is in Patna's Indira Gandhi Science Complex. It claims to be one of the largest planetariums in Asia and to attract a large number of tourists. The Sanjay Gandhi Jaivik Udyan (Patna Zoo) is at Bailey Road, Raj Bhawan, Rajbanshi Nagar, and includes over 300 mammals, 300 birds, and 450 species of reptiles as of January 2019.

In 2015, the Bihar government has built a state-of-the-art art landmark museum in Patna at a cost of approximately 530 crores on a site of 13.9 acres at Bailey Road. 5 firms were shortlisted for the architectural design, of which the Japanese firm Maki and Associates was chosen. It is now completed and opened for all. Completed in May 2018, the Sabhyata Dwar was built with  Mauryan-style architecture. It was opened to the general public in December 2018.

In 2014, the Bihar government laid the foundation of Samrat Ashok International Convention Centre. It is expected to use more steel than used in raising Eiffel Tower and Indira Gandhi International Airport. Construction of Dr. A.P.J Abdul Kalam Science City began in February 2019. The Eco Park is in Jawaharlal Nehru Marg. It has more than 3,000 varieties of plants and includes several theme parks, a restaurant, and a boat trip zone.

Education

Schools in Patna are either government-run schools or private schools. The schools are affiliated to Bihar School Examination Board (BSEB), Council for the Indian School Certificate Examinations (CISCE), National Institute of Open Schooling (NIOS), or the Central Board of Secondary Education (CBSE) boards. A number of Bengali medium schools also thrive in Patna. Hindi and English are the primary languages of instruction. A 2012 survey found 1,574 schools: of these, 78% were private unaided schools (most of them at an affordable cost), 21% were government schools and 1% were private aided.

Under the 10+2+3/4 plan, students complete ten years of schooling and then enroll in schools that have a higher secondary facility and are affiliated to the Bihar State Intermediate Board, the All-India Council for the Indian School Certificate Examinations (CISCE), the NIOS or the CBSE, where they select one of three streams: arts, commerce, or science. This is followed by either a general degree course in a chosen field of study or a professional degree course, such as law, engineering, and medicine.

Patna has important government educational institutions like Patna University, Anugrah Narayan College, Chanakya National Law University, Aryabhatta Knowledge University, Indian Institute of Technology Patna, Bakhtiyarpur College of Engineering, National Institute of Technology, Patna, Patna Science College, Patna Women's College, Patna Law College, Bihar Veterinary College, J.D. Women's College, Birla Institute of Technology, Patna, Patna Medical College Hospital, Rajendra Memorial Research Institute of Medical Sciences, Nalanda Medical College Hospital, Indira Gandhi Institute of Medical Sciences, Mahavir Cancer Sansthan, All India Institute of Medical Sciences Patna, National Institute of Fashion Technology Patna, Chandragupta Institute of Management, Development Management Institute, National Institute of Electronics & Information Technology, Patliputra University.

Patna University was established in 1917 and is the seventh oldest modern university in the Indian Sub-continent. Patna also has a variety of other universities, as well as many primary and secondary schools.

The University, created as a revival of an ancient centre of learning at Nalanda, began its first academic session on 1 September 2014. It will attract students from across the globe.

Sports

As in the rest of India, cricket is popular in Patna and is played on grounds and in streets throughout the city. There are several sports grounds across the city. The Bihar Cricket Association, which regulates cricket in Bihar, is based in the city. Tournaments, especially those involving cricket, basketball, football, badminton, and table tennis, are regularly organised on an inter-locality or inter-club basis.

Moin-ul-Haq Stadium, which has a capacity of 25,000, has served as the venue for two one-day international cricket matches and several national sports events. It was home to the Bihar cricket team. Due to negligence and lack of maintenance, the stadium is in a dilapidated state and no international match has been played here since 1996. In 2013, it was announced by the Chief Minister of Bihar Nitish Kumar that an international cricket stadium will be constructed at Rajgir.

The Patna Golf Club was established on 21 March 1916, and is one of the oldest golf courses in India. It has 18 holes in a historic setting in and around Bailey Road, a  course.

Patna hosted the first ever woman's Kabaddi world cup. It was held at the Patliputra Sports Complex, Kankarbagh from 1 to 4 March 2012. Hosts India won the World Cup defeating Iran in the finals. Patna also hosts the seven league matches of Pro Kabaddi League with its home team as Patna Pirates at the Patliputra Sports Complex.

Other famous sports complexes of Patna are Bihar Military Police's Mithilesh Stadium, East Central Railway zone's indoor stadium at Digha etc.

Media
The beginning of the 20th century was marked by a number of notable new publications. A monthly magazine named Bharat Ratna was started in Patna in 1901. It was followed by Ksahtriya Hitaishi, Aryavarta from Dinapure, Patna, Udyoga and Chaitanya Chandrika. Udyog was edited by Vijyaanand Tripathy, a famous poet of the time and Chaitanya Chandrika by Krishna Chaitanya Goswami, a literary figure of that time. The literary activity was not confined to Patna alone but to many districts of Bihar.

Magahi Parishad, established in Patna in 1952, pioneered Magadhi journalism in Bihar. It started the monthly journal, Magadhi, which was later renamed Bihan.

Many national media agencies, including the Press Trust of India and Doordarshan's regional offices, are based in the city. The Hindu, The Times of India, Hindustan Times, The Economic Times and The Telegraph are the five principal English-language daily newspapers which have Patna editions. The Pioneer and The Indian Express, though not printed in the city, are other English-language daily newspapers available in the city. The city's Hindi newspapers include Hindustan Dainik, Dainik Jagran, Dainik Bhaskar, Prabhat Khabar, Aaj and Rashtriya Sahara, all of which have editions from Patna. There are also daily Urdu newspapers like Qaumi Tanzeem and Farooqi Tanzeem published in Patna. There is also the Hindi and English mixed newspaper tabloid Inext.

Patna has several AM and FM radio stations, including many state-owned channels. The city hosts several radio stations, including the state-owned All India Radio's Vividh Bharati, and FM 105. The All India Radio, Patna (officially Akashvani Patna Kendra) was established in 1948.

Patna is served by several private channels.

Private FM stations

Notable people

See also
 List of cities in Bihar by population

References

Further reading
 
 
 
 
 
 
Nas Margens do Hindustão : o estado da India e a expansão mongol ca.1570-1640. Por Jorge Flores

External links

 Official website of Patna district
 Official website of the Municipal Corporation of Patna
 The Portuguese on the Bay of Bengal

 
5th-century BC establishments
Cities and towns in Patna district
Indian capital cities
Holy cities
Metropolitan cities in India
Populated places established in the 5th century BC